Martin Francis Phelan (5 August 1916 – 29 December 1974) was an Australian rules footballer who played with Footscray in the Victorian Football League (VFL).

Notes

External links 

1916 births
1974 deaths
Australian rules footballers from Victoria (Australia)
Western Bulldogs players
Williamstown Football Club players